Monza Park (Parco di Monza) is a large walled park in Monza,  Lombardy, northern Italy.

The park was commissioned by Napoleon's stepson Eugène de Beauharnais, during the French occupation of northern Italy, as external part of the garden of his royal palace (the Royal Villa of Monza); it was completed in 1808.

The park is crossed in its southern sector by the Lambro river. Some one third of the park is occupied by woods, while the rest is kept as lawn.

The Autodromo Nazionale Monza racetrack has been located inside the park since 1922. Meanwhile, the Golf Club Milano is a golf course that has hosted nine editions of the Italian Open.

External links

Official website

Parks in Lombardy
Buildings and structures in Monza
1808 establishments in Europe